In molecular biology, the CDC48 N-terminal domain is a protein domain found in AAA ATPases including cell division protein 48 (CDC48), VCP-like ATPase and N-ethylmaleimide sensitive fusion protein. It is a substrate recognition domain which binds polypeptides, prevents protein aggregation, and catalyses refolding of permissive substrates. It is composed of two equally sized subdomains. The amino-terminal subdomain (CDC48_N) forms a double-psi beta-barrel whose pseudo-twofold symmetry is mirrored by an internal sequence repeat of 42 residues. The carboxy-terminal subdomain (CDC48_2) forms a novel six-stranded beta-clam fold. Together these subdomains form a kidney-shaped structure, in close agreement with results from electron microscopy. CDC48_N is related to numerous proteins including prokaryotic transcription factors, metabolic enzymes, the protease cofactors UFD1 and PrlF, and aspartic proteinases.

References

Protein domains